The Pastaza corydoras (Corydoras pastazensis) is a tropical freshwater fish belonging to the Corydoradinae sub-family of the family Callichthyidae. It originates in inland waters in South America, and is found in the Pastaza River basin in Ecuador. It is named for the river in which it is found.

It lives in a tropical climate in water with a 6.0 – 8.0 pH, a water hardness of 2 – 25 dGH, and a temperature range of 22 – 26°C (72 – 79°F). It feeds on worms, benthic crustaceans, insects, and plant matter. It lays eggs in dense vegetation and adults do not guard the eggs.

The Pastaza corydoras is of commercial importance in the aquarium trade industry.

See also
 List of freshwater aquarium fish species

References

External links
Corydoras pastazensis aquarium fish profile on The Aquarium Wiki Encyclopaedia

Corydoras
Freshwater fish of Ecuador
Fishkeeping
Taxa named by Stanley Howard Weitzman
Fish described in 1963